Ibrahim Youssef Awadallah (1 January 1959 – 10 July 2013), nicknamed "Black Deer الغزال الأسمر" was an Egyptian football player.

Club career
Youssef played for Zamalek as a defender.

International career
He was called up for the 1976 Copa Africa and also played for Egypt at the 1984 Summer Olympics in Los Angeles.  Youssef played for Egypt in Mediterranean Games 1983, where his team won a bronze medal, and the African Cup 1984.He later coached the U-17 National team & Zamalek.

Titles

Personal
Best Egyptian footballer several times
Best Libero in African cup 1984
2nd place - African footballer of the year by France Football 1984
3rd place - African footballer of the year by France Football 1985
Considered the best Libero in Egypt's history

For Egypt
All Africa Games Gold Medal 1987
Mediterranean Games Bronze Medal 1983

For Zamalek 
Egyptian league title: 1983/84 & 1987/88
Egyptian Cup title: 1978/79 & 1987/88
African champions league title: 1984 & 1986
Afro-Asian Cup title: 1988

References

External links

Ibrahim Youssef's profile at the official website of Zamalek Sporting Club 

1959 births
2013 deaths
Sportspeople from Giza
Egyptian footballers
Egypt international footballers
Zamalek SC players
Egyptian football managers
Zamalek SC managers
Mediterranean Games bronze medalists for Egypt
Competitors at the 1983 Mediterranean Games
Footballers at the 1984 Summer Olympics
Olympic footballers of Egypt
1976 African Cup of Nations players
1984 African Cup of Nations players
Egyptian Premier League players
Association football defenders
Mediterranean Games medalists in football
20th-century Egyptian people
21st-century Egyptian people